The Rugby Europe Super Cup is an annual men's rugby union club tournament organised by the continental governing body, Rugby Europe. Featuring clubs outside the traditional Six Nations strongholds of the sport, it effectively forms a third tier of European club rugby beneath the EPCR-organised European Rugby Champions Cup and European Rugby Challenge Cup. The first Super Cup draw will take place in 2021.

Format 
The tournament was announced as an annual event for emerging nations in Europe. Professional rugby clubs and franchise teams can take part in it. Teams are divided into two conferences: western and eastern. Each team will play every conference rival home and away. The two best teams from each conference will advance to the semi-finals, where they will play for a ticket to the final.

The first competition included two Russian teams who were expelled following the invasion of Ukraine, to be replaced with teams from Romania and Georgia in the second season.

The goal of the tournament is to bridge the development gap between European countries and attract new sponsors in new markets. All 27 matches will be filmed and widely broadcast on TV and digital platforms.

The plan is to expand the Super Cup to include 12 teams by 2023 and 16 teams by 2025.

Finals

Performances by team

References 

 
Rugby union competitions
Recurring sporting events established in 2021